Chris Buncombe (born 5 May 1978 in Taunton, Somerset, England) is a British racing driver who made his last appearance at the Le Mans 24 Hours was in 2011. He joined Aston Martin Racing at the end of the 2009 season when he drove in the Le Mans Series scoring a podium finish on his debut with the team at Nürburgring driving the 008 Aston Martin LMP1 car. Chris won the 2007 24 Hours of Le Mans in the LMP2 class driving for Binnie Motorsports in their Lola B05/40-Zytek.

Career
2018
Blancpain Endurance GT Pro-Am Champion - Strakka Racing Mercedes AMG GT3 with Nick Leventis & Lewis Williamson
Runner-Up FIA GT Nations Cup - Team UK AF Corse Ferrari 488 GT3
Asian Le Mans Series with United Autosports

2013
Spa 24 Hours with Nissan Team RJN GTR GT-3

2011
Le Mans 24 Hours with JOTA Sport Aston Martin GTE 
Le Mans Series Silverstone 

2010
American Le Mans Series LMP2 single race at Mid Ohio. Le Mans Series LMP2 single race at Hungaroring

2009
Factory driver for Aston Martin Racing in the LMP1 car number 008 for the Le Mans Series where the Team scored an Aston Martin 1-2-3 at the ADAC 1000 km of Nürburgring, 50 years on from Aston Martin's 1959 win at the classic German endurance race in the DBR1.

2008
Speedcar Series Nascar alongside various races for JD Classics in their Group C Jaguar XJR-9 & XJR-11

2007 
Le Mans Series & Le Mans 24 Hours debut for US based Team, Binnie Motorsports driving with Bill Binnie and Allen Timpany in the Lola B05/40-Zytek LMP2, winning the LMP2 class at Le Mans

2006
FIA GT1 Spa 24 Hours for Team SRT in the Corvette C5-R

2005 
FIA GT Championship driving the Red Bull Maserati MC12 for JMB Racing, driving with Philipp Peter and Roman Rusinov

2004
Racing in the FIA GT Championship with JMB Racing in the #18 Ferrari 575M GT1. Teammates included Karl Wendlinger, Tarso Marques and Bert Longin.

2002
RJN Motorsport Nissan FIA European Touring Car Championship.

2001 
British Formula Renault with Manor Motorsport. 

1997-2000
Chris raced in the British Formula Renault Championship before joining the factory Nissan Motorsports Europe (NME) Team when he raced the Nissan Primera in the Benelux Championship during 1999 and the RJN Motorsport Nissan Primera in the 2000 Spa 24 Hours. 

1995-1996
Winner Formula Vauxhall Junior Young Driver Scholarship
British Formula Vauxhall Junior Championship

1993-1995
Karting - British Super One Championship

1988-1993
Schoolboy motocross

Family History
Chris grew up from a motorsport family. His grandfather, John Buncombe, competed during the 1950s & '60s. His father, Jonathan Buncombe raced for over 20 years for multiple manufacturers including Ford, GM and early racing career in Minis.
Chris' brother, Alex is a Factory Nissan Nismo driver, 2015 Blancpain Endurance Series Champion and represented Nissan in multiple race series including GT3, GT4, Australian V8 Supercars, Nurburgring 24 Hours, Petit Le Mans and the Le Mans 24 Hours in LMP1.

24 Hours of Le Mans results

References

External links
 Official Website
 Driver DB Profile

1979 births
Living people
English racing drivers
European Le Mans Series drivers
Sportspeople from Taunton
24 Hours of Le Mans drivers
24 Hours of Spa drivers
European Touring Car Championship drivers
British GT Championship drivers
AF Corse drivers
Jota Sport drivers
Strakka Racing drivers
United Autosports drivers
Asian Le Mans Series drivers
Blancpain Endurance Series drivers
American Le Mans Series drivers
Aston Martin Racing drivers
Charouz Racing System drivers
FIA GT Championship drivers
British Formula Renault 2.0 drivers
Manor Motorsport drivers
Team West-Tec drivers
Le Mans Cup drivers